ʿAlī ibn ʿAbd Allāh ibn al-ʿAbbās ibn ʿAbd al-Muṭṭalib (ca. 661–ca. 736) was an ancestor of the Abbasids. He was a grandson of al-Abbas ibn Abd al-Muttalib and the grandfather of the first two Abbasid caliphs al-Saffah and al-Mansur.

Life
Ali was the youngest son of Abd Allah ibn Abbas, the cousin of the Islamic prophet Muhammad, and Zur'ah bint Mishrah, a daughter of one of the "four kings" of the tribe of Kindah. According to tradition he was born on the exact night that the assassination of Ali ibn Abi Talib (d. 661) took place, but there are also alternative sources that dispute the year of his birth.

As an adult, Ali eventually ran afoul of the Umayyad government during the reign of al-Walid ibn Abd al-Malik (r. 705–715), who ordered him to be flogged and banished from the capital. He subsequently relocated to the province of al-Sharat, on the border between Palestine and Arabia, and took up residence at the village of Humayma, establishing that place as the new headquarters of the Abbasid family. He died at Humayma in 735-6 or the following year, by which time his son Muhammad had already assumed leadership of the family and the Abbasid propaganda effort.

Characterization and offspring
Ali is described as being a handsome man of large stature and fair complexion, with black-dyed hair, a long beard, and a bald head which was concealed by a cap. He was considered extremely pious and was said to pray constantly, and in orthodox circles he eventually came to be known by the surname of "al-Sajjid" (meaning one who prostrates himself habitually). 

Ali reportedly fathered upwards of twenty male children during his stay at Humayma. His most prominent son was Muhammad, who became one of the leading figures of the Abbasid cause and the father of the future caliphs al-Saffah and al-Mansur. Other of his offspring, including Isa, Dawud, Sulayman, Abd al-Samad, Salih, Isma'il, and Abd Allah, were active participants in the Abbasid Revolution, and several of them continued to play a prominent role in the first decades of the Abbasid Caliphate.

Notes

References
 
 
 
 
 

661 births
736 deaths
Banu Abbas
7th-century Arabs
8th-century Arabs